My Monster Secret, known in Japan as , is a Japanese manga series written and illustrated by Eiji Masuda. It was serialized in Akita Shoten's shōnen manga magazine Weekly Shōnen Champion from January 31, 2013 to February 16, 2017. Akita Shoten collected the series in 22 tankōbon volumes.

An anime television series adaptation ran from July to September 2015. AnimeLab has secured streaming rights in Australia and New Zealand.

Seven Seas Entertainment acquired the rights to translate and distribute the manga for North America, with the first volume being released in January 2016.

Plot
Asahi Kuromine, a normal high school student who supposedly cannot keep a secret, finds his demeanor quickly challenged when he spots his classmate and crush, Youko Shiragami, unfurling a large pair of wings from her back when he tries to propose. He learns that Youko is a vampire, and that she is only able to attend a normal school on one condition: no one must discover her true identity. This secret becomes difficult to maintain, as Youko herself is an airhead and Asahi's childhood friend Mikan keeps bullying the two of them. Love is blooming between Asahi and Youko but things are not very easy. Later on, Asahi discovers more girls in his school with secrets of their own: a tiny alien who rides a human-sized exoskeleton of herself, a werewolf capable of switching gender at any depiction of a moon, a thousand-year-old demon who secretly runs the school, and more who not only pose a challenge as Asahi tries to maintain Youko's secret, but also secretly like Asahi and despise the idea of Asahi and Youko being a couple, thus trying to separate them.

Characters

Asahi is a second year high school student who seemingly cannot keep a secret, so much that his nickname is "leaky basket." He discovers that his current crush, Youko, is a vampire when he finds her unfurling her wings after school. As a result, he is forced to keep her secret, lest she have to drop out of both school and his life. Throughout the series, he comes to learn secrets about his other classmates and finds that the people around him are not who they seem to be. Often forced to play the straight man in increasingly absurd situations, Asahi often acts as the narrator through his inner monologues. He is also susceptible to projectile nosebleeds when confronted with perverse situations, earning the nickname "Eromine" from Youko. Asahi has a younger sister named Mei, though she is barely mentioned in the story until much later on. As the series progresses, Asahi and Youko begin dating, eventually becoming a couple.

Youko is a classmate of Asahi and the daughter of a human and a vampire. Though she has long canine teeth, many other typical vampiric characteristics are downplayed, such as only getting tanned in sunlight or feeling guilty when entering a room uninvited. She has a Kansai accent, but speaks in honorifics so as not to expose her teeth. While initially coming across as haughty, her true personality is bubbly and absent minded. Her dream is to become a cool beauty, but has yet to accomplish this goal. Though initially friendly with Asahi, she develops romantic feelings for him, but keeps them to herself because she believes Asahi likes Aizawa. She is also often hungry, due to not being able to eat lunch for fear of revealing her teeth. As the series progresses, Asahi and Youko begin dating, and accidentally becomes pregnant with Asahi's child after regularly sucking his blood, unaware that for a vampire, sucking a person's blood has the same effect as sexual intercourse.

Nagisa is a classmate of Asahi and Youko, and is also a small alien riding a human-sized robotic exoskeleton of herself. Initially the love interest of Asahi before the series began, she turned him down before he could confess, believing that her secret would be discovered if she started a relationship with him. She, like most of Asahi's friends, is aware of his feelings for Youko, and develops feelings for him after the fact. Her alien species is militaristic, and she often uses military terminology when describing things. Her exoskeleton runs on an internal battery that must be constantly recharged with an AC outlet and has on many occasions run out of power for comedic effect. She is usually meticulous and serious with her actions, though loses her composure when dealing with embarrassing situations. Nagisa has an older brother, Ryo, whom she initially respects and draws inspiration from, before learning he is less reliable than she initially realized. As a small alien, she is always wearing the same clothes her robot is wearing. Her exoskeleton has a metal screw cockpit opening with an antenna sticking out of it, but no one guesses what she really is despite this. When Youko and Asahi start to date, she decides to put her feelings aside to help them, and remain friends. 

Mikan is a childhood friend of Asahi who bullies him relentlessly. She is the president of the Newspaper Club, and has used her position to turn it into a supermarket tabloid. Most of the time, though, the newspaper club members do all the work for her. She secretly likes Asahi, but perceives her lack of femininity as a barrier she cannot overcome, and prefers instead to bully and tease him. She wears fake glasses Asahi won at a carnival when they were younger, and they later become the host of a fortune god in training, though this god's attempts to help only end up causing her more misfortune. Mikan has two younger brothers who occasionally appear in the story. She eventually reveals her feelings to Asahi, who turns her down but also reveals that he has always seen her as a girl, and she just never noticed it, much to her own regret. While she generally puts forward a facade of evilness, she genuinely cares about her friends and will do her best to help them. 
 / 

Shishido is Youko's childhood friend and a wolfman. Initially appearing as Shirou, an intimidating man with sharp teeth, upon seeing any depiction of The Moon, he transforms into Shiho, a busty, self-proclaimed pervert. A second glimpse of The Moon transforms Shishido back into Shirou. Shiho is the dominant personality, and is aware of everything that occurs when Shirou is in control of her body. While Shirou has a crush on Youko and attempts to discover if Asahi is aware of her secret, Shiho is more playful and amorous, deriving enjoyment from being perverse. She often tries to force Youko into admitting her true feelings towards Asahi, and having a perverted crush on Asahi, and tries to expose herself to him. While her father is also a wolfman, her mother is only shown in silhouette and is referred to as the "Charismatic Female Pervert."

Principal of Asahi's high school and a thousand year-old demon, although her appearance is of the body of a young girl with demonic horns. Despite her age, she is often quick to exhibit childish tendencies, such as playing large-scale pranks on the people at school and quickly getting excited whenever she believes sweets are nearby. She takes special delight in ruining Akari's life when given the chance. As a demon, Akane is capable of magically transforming herself and others around her, as well as multiplying herself (though the clones will also display copies of her horns on their head). She was the teacher of Youko's parents when they attended her high school. It is implied that her present form is not her true appearance; In the past it was revealed that she had a much more mature and menacing appearance, and she has reverted to that look in the present on certain occasions. Her true appearance is never confirmed. She is extremely powerful, although not omnipotent, ranking among the other high-rank demons, but she is jealous of them, since she does not have any legends about herself. 

Asahi's homeroom teacher and former delinquent known as "Akari of the Hundred Visits" due to responding violently after being rejected by, apparently, 100 boys across different schools. She is Akane's great-great-granddaughter, and while she does not retain any demonic powers, her short temper and unnaturally strong fighting ability allows her to rein in Akane's misbehavior. Aware of the various secret students in her class, she attempts to be a reliable authority figure. However, she often finds herself dragged into crazy situations between her heavy drinking, her near-impossible wish for a perfect man to literally appear on a white horse and marry her, and Akane's own devilish mischief. She is later called Akari-chan by Youko, who comes to see her as an equal rather than just a teacher. She works hard to change her image of a spinster into that of a cute girl, but her attempts are always marred by Akane's pranks. 

Rin is a first high school student and secretly Asahi's and Mikan's time traveling granddaughter from the future (The daughter of Asahi's Daughter and Mikan's Son). She claims to have returned to the past to prevent a dystopian future in which an entity known only as "Charismatic Female Pervert II" has taken over the world, turning 90% of the male humans on Earth into masochistic slaves and 70% of the females into like-minded perverts - however, this is later revealed to be a lie, as she has actually returned to try and prevent the series of events that lead to Youko being exposed and abandoning Asahi. She travels back in time using a dragon-shaped time machine and wields a sword capable of making clothes more modest. Usually quiet, she is protective of Asahi, whom she treats like a grandfather, not adapting her behavior to his younger appearance. Also like Asahi, she has trouble keeping a secret, accidentally letting slip to him that she was a time-traveler despite the possibility of creating an irreversible temporal paradox by doing so. Her grandparents are eventually revealed to be Asahi, Yōko, Mikan and Okada.

Asahi's three male friends. Okada wears glasses and is often seen with a juice box in his mouth. Shimada often attempts to hit on various female classmates (notably Nagisa's disguised older brother, Ryō) with little success. Sakurada is younger than he appears to be, and is often smiling. All three try to support Asahi, though they often mock his inability to keep a secret. Throughout the manga, their first names have been revealed; Sakurada's name is Kōsuke, Shimada's name is Yūta, and Okada's name is Kanade.
Okada is revealed to be a read people's minds, against his own wishes. He became friends with Asahi and Mikan, when he was amused by Asahi's inability to hide what he was thinking and Mikan's contrasting actions and personality. He gradually fell in love with her, but refrained from confessing as he was aware of Mikan's feelings for Asahi. He eventually did confess, and it is revealed that they got married in the future.
Sakurada was once a delinquent, against his own wishes. He was often attacked and mocked because of his naturally massive build and menacing appearance, and no one would believe him because of that fact. Before he entered high-school, he and his gang attacked Akari, but she beat them all senseless. She consoled Sakurada, which resulted in him falling for her. He eventually succeeded in confessing to her and they began to date in "secret", while everyone actually knew the truth.
 and 

Youko's father and mother who had a high school romance similar to Youko and Asahi. Genjirou is a scarred 4-meter tall vampire with an intimidating aura. He is overly protective of his daughter, at one point even disguising himself as a female assistant teacher at the school to find out the truth of Asahi's relationship with his daughter. Touko is a normal sized human woman who often ends up reigning in Genjirou's behavior through various blunt instruments.

Introduced as a demon, Karen is actually a fallen angel who lost her halo, which Akane uses as a light bulb without her knowledge. Honest and gentle to a fault, her attempts to be demonic are often seen as angelic, though annoying. She was Genjirou and Touko's classmate, and is the current student council president, having retained the position for over 20 years at the request of Akane. Her feathers can invoke one of the seven deadly sins in whoever gets stuck with them.

The older brother of Nagisa. He, like his sister, moves around in an exoskeleton that is the size of a human body. His exoskeleton is the body of a girl 'ghost' so that Nagisa wouldn't know that he was in there. He is usually the victim of Shimada's continual flirtation, even to the point of almost kissing him.

A ninja from a different time-period who tends to fall in love with the first guy she bumps into, including Asahi and Okada. However, her use of ninja equipment usually intimidates anyone she tries to attract. Revealed to be Shimada and Shihos' time traveling granddaughter.

Asahi's younger sister. Not much is known about her, other than she is Yuika's somewhat supportive friend. She and Asahi have a rather generic sibling relationship; caring for each other without thinking about it, while also ignoring each other.

The student representative of Mei and Yuika's class. Secretly a succubus who drains men's energy when seducing them, though Saki herself has little in the way of skills or experience doing so. Following the decline of the succubus race due to the "Charismatic Female Pervert," she vows to return the race to its former glory in the "Tokyo Pervert Olympics."

A Vampire-Hunter, who has no intention of actually hunting vampires. Another self-proclaimed pervert, he occasionally imparts some advice to Asahi on how to deal with Youko's vampire problems. It is implied that his father marries Okada's mother, making them step-brothers in the future.

The principal of Morobare high school from Genjirou and Touko's past. Shirayuki is a cruel individual who feels absolute disgust at the thought that human and non-human species can coexist, believing it goes against the pride of non-humans. Through manipulation, she was the one that orchestrated the events that culminated in Genjirou's secret being revealed and subsequently preventing his graduation and causing his isolation, taking great delight on the deed. Disgusted at her actions, Akane forced her to quit as Principal and threatened to kill her should she ever return. Learning about the time-travelers attempt to help Asahi protect Youko's secret from an incoming threat, Shirayuki ambushes Akane to reclaim her position as principal to re-enact her separatist agenda.

Although she nearly succeeds in her goals, being assisted by Genjirou, she is confronted by Akane who was freed from Shirayuki's ice by Akari, Karen and future Nagisa. Cornered she attempts to jump from the school's roof to commit suicide, which forces Youko to show her vampire identity to save her. Fearing for her daughter Genjirou tries to take Youko away but Asahi convinces him to let them marry after every non-human in the school decides to reveal their own secrets, but with widespread acceptance by their human peers.

It is revealed that she is in truth a centuries old human who became a Yuki-onna after an event in her childhood which caused a non-human friend of hers to be exchanged by money by the human villagers in order to secure funds to survive. Having seen this pattern to repeat itself several times, left her with a deep traumatic experience which is the foundation of her beliefs. After seeing that her long time wish requested to Akane came true at last with both species interacting normally, she finds relief and her spirit is put to rest as she had in fact passed away and became a ghost.

Media

Manga
Written and illustrated by Eiji Masuda, My Monster Secret has been serialized in the manga anthology Weekly Shōnen Champion from January 31, 2013 to February 16, 2017 and collected into twenty-two volumes by Akita Shoten. Seven Seas Entertainment has licensed the manga for North America under the title My Monster Secret and published the first volume on January 12, 2016.

Volume list

Anime
The anime adaptation of My Monster Secret began airing on July 6, 2015 in Japan and streaming to North American audiences via Crunchyroll as Actually, I am.... the same day. Additionally, three character song volumes were released: Volume 1 featuring Yōko Shiragami (Yū Serizawa) and Shiho Shishido (Aya Uchida), Volume 2 featuring Nagisa Aizawa (Inori Minase) and Mikan Akemi (Reina Ueda), and Volume 3 featuring Akane Kōmoto (Mao Ichimichi) and Akari Kōmoto (Emi Nitta).

The anime is licensed by Discotek Media. It was released on DVD and Blu-ray in February 2017.

Character songs
Volume 1 primarily features Yōko Shiragami and Shiho Shishido. Songs included are  sung by Yōko;  sung by Yōko, Nagisa, Mikan, and Shiho; StartingHeart sung by Yōko and Shiho; and  sung by Shiho.

Volume 2 primarily features Nagisa Aizawa and Mikan Akemi. Songs included are  sung by Nagisa;  sung by Mikan; and Silent Note sung by Nagisa and Mikan.

Volume 3 primarily features Akane Kōmoto and Akari Kōmoto. Songs included are Satanic Surfer  sung by Akane and Akari; sung by Akane; and Day by Day sung by Akari.

Episode list

Reception
The manga had 1.5 million copies in print as of March 2016.

References

External links
  
 My Monster Secret  at Seven Seas Entertainment
 

Akita Shoten manga
Anime series based on manga
Discotek Media
Romantic comedy anime and manga
Seven Seas Entertainment titles
Shōnen manga
Seven deadly sins in popular culture
TMS Entertainment
Vampires in anime and manga